Ivor Guest may refer to:

Ivor Guest, 1st Baron Wimborne (1835–1914), Welsh industrialist
Ivor Guest, 1st Viscount Wimborne (1873–1939), British politician, one of the last Lords Lieutenant of Ireland
Ivor Guest, 2nd Viscount Wimborne (1903–1967), British politician
Ivor Guest, 3rd Viscount Wimborne (1939–1993), British businessman
Ivor Guest, 4th Viscount Wimborne (born 1968), British record producer and composer
Ivor Forbes Guest (1920–2018), British lawyer and ballet historian, husband of movement notation expert Ann Hutchinson Guest
Ivor Guest (died 1917), elder brother of Ernest Lucas Guest and uncle of Ivor Forbes Guest